Stranje pri Dobrniču is a small settlement north of Dobrnič in the Municipality of Trebnje in eastern Slovenia. The municipality is included in the Southeast Slovenia Statistical Region. The entire area is part of the historical region of Lower Carniola.

Name
The name of the settlement was changed from Stranje to Stranje pri Dobrniču in 1953.

References

External links
Stranje pri Dobrniču at Geopedia

Populated places in the Municipality of Trebnje